Flurb was an American science fiction webzine, edited by  author Rudy Rucker and launched in August 2006.  In addition to short stories, Flurb featured paintings and photography by Rucker.  It was released biannually.  The author of an accepted story retained full copyright, including the right to have the story published elsewhere, and to request that it be taken down at any time.

Flurb releases tended to garner significant online attention, with issues having been mentioned in several blogs including Boing Boing and io9.

Contributors to Flurb included Terry Bisson, Eileen Gunn, John Kessel, Kim Stanley Robinson, Paul Di Filippo, John Shirley, Charles Stross and Cory Doctorow, as well as Rucker himself.

Flurb closed in 2012.

References

External links
Flurb Homepage

Online magazines published in the United States
Magazines established in 2006
Magazines disestablished in 2012
Science fiction webzines
Defunct science fiction magazines published in the United States